The Lebanese Basketball Federation, known in French as the Fédération Libanaise de Basketball (FLB or FLBB), is the governing body of basketball in Lebanon.

The federation founded in 1947, represents basketball with public authorities as well as with national and international sports organizations and as such with Lebanon in international competitions. It also defends the moral and material interests of Lebanese basketball. It is affiliated with FIBA and FIBA Asia.

The federation also organizes the Lebanon national basketball team and the Lebanon women's national basketball team.

Leagues
The FLB organizes these tournaments:
Lebanese Basketball League

National team
The FLB manages these national teams:
Men's (Senior, U-19, U-17)
Women's (Senior, U-19, U-17)

References

External links
Official website of the Lebanese Basketball Federation
FIBA Profile

1947 establishments in Lebanon
Basketball in Lebanon
Basketball governing bodies in Asia
Sports organizations established in 1947
Basketball